The dérive ("drift") is a revolutionary strategy originally put forward in the "Theory of the Dérive" (1956) by Guy Debord, a member at the time of the Letterist International. Debord defines the dérive as "a mode of experimental behaviour linked to the conditions of urban society: a technique of rapid passage through varied ambiances." It is an unplanned journey through a landscape, usually urban, in which participants drop their everyday relations and "let themselves be drawn by the attractions of the terrain and the encounters they find there". Though solo dérives are possible, Debord indicates that the most fruitful numerical arrangement consists of several small groups of two or three people who have reached the same level of awareness, since cross-checking these different groups' impressions makes it possible to arrive at more objective conclusions.The dérive goals include studying the terrain of the city (psychogeography) and emotional disorientation, both of which lead to the potential creation of Situations.

History

The concept of the dérive has its origins in the Letterist International, an avant-garde and Marxist collective based in Paris. The dérive was a critical tool for understanding and developing the theory of psychogeography, defined as the "specific effects of the geographical environment (whether consciously organized or not) on the emotions and behavior of individuals."

The dérive continued to be a critical concept in the theories of the Situationist International, a radical group of avant-garde artists and political theorists that was formed out of the Letterist International, CoBrA, and the International Movement for an Imaginist Bauhaus in the 1950s. For the Situationists, the dérive was a revolutionary technique to combat the malaise and boredom of the society of the spectacle.

Dérives are necessary, according to Situationist theory, because of the increasingly predictable and monotonous experience of everyday life in advanced capitalism. Debord observes in his Introduction to a Critique of Urban Geography:

In his manifesto for unitary urbanism Raoul Vaneigem articulated some further ideas behind the dérive and the Situationist critique of space: "All space is occupied by the enemy.  We are living under a permanent curfew.  Not just the cops — the geometry". Dérive, as a previously conceptualized tactic in the French military, was "a calculated action determined by the absence of a greater locus", and "a maneuver within the enemy's field of vision". To the SI, whose interest was inhabiting space, the dérive brought appeal in this sense of taking the "fight" to the streets and truly indulging in a determined operation.

Praxis
Several groups have adopted the concept of the dérive and applied it in their own form, including many modern organizations, most notably the Loiterers Resistance Movement (Manchester), the London Psychogeographical Association, Wrights & Sites (notably the misguided drifts of mythogeographer Phil Smith), the Unilalia Group, and the Providence Initiative for Psychogeographic Studies. Since 2003 in the United States, separate events known as the Providence Initiative for Psychogeographic Studies and Psy-Geo-Conflux have been dedicated to action-based participatory experiments similar to the dérive within the context of psychogeography.

Technology
A smartphone app named Dérive was developed in the 21st century by a team including Eduardo Cachucho and Babak Fakhamzadeh. The smartphone app shows a series of simple geography-based directions on a mobile device's screen such as "follow a red vehicle" to create the dérive to experience.

There is also a similar application with the same name from a Russian developer who does not require installation and works directly in a browser with an additional mapping drift mode, where the application generates a point on the map to move to.

In March 2020, an iOS and Android app called Randonautica launched and cited Guy Debord's essay on dérive as a core inspiration. It uses a random number generator to seed a random map location that the user is prompted to walk to while holding an intention in mind.

See also
Flâneur
Parkour
A Moveable Feast

References

External links 
Texts
Introduction to a Critique of Urban Geography, Guy Debord, (1955)
Theory of the Dérive, Guy Debord, (1956)

Films
Psychohydrography, a dérive film (2010), by Peter Bo Rappmund
Taxi, 2015, Iranian docufiction on Tehran by Jafar Panahi at The Guardian
Drits (Derivas), 2016, a Portuguese docufiction on Lisbon by Ricardo Costa

Social philosophy
Psychogeography
Everyday life